The 2019 Senior Open Championship was a senior major golf championship and the 33rd Senior Open Championship, held on 25–28 July at Royal Lytham & St Annes Golf Club in Lytham, England. It was the 5th Senior Open Championship played at the course and the 17th Senior Open Championship played as a senior major championship.

World Golf Hall of Fame member Bernhard Langer won by two strokes over Paul Broadhurst. The 2019 event was Langer's fourth Senior Open Championship title and his 11th senior major championship victory.

Venue

The 2019 event was the fifth Senior Open Championship played at Royal Lytham & St Annes Golf Club.

Course layout

Field
The field consisted of 144 competitors: 136 professionals and 8 amateurs. An 18-hole stroke play qualifying round was held on Monday, 22 July for players who were not already exempt.

Past champions in the field

Made the cut

Missed the cut

Round summaries

First round
Thursday, 25 July 2019

Second round
Friday, 26 July 2019

Amateurs: Elliott (+3), Kelbrick (+5), Foster (+6), McWilliams (+11), Sansome (+14), Crowther (+15), Lacy (+16), Francis (+20)

Third round
Saturday, 27 July 2019

Amateurs: Elliott (+9), Kelbrick (+13)

Final round
Sunday, 28 July 2019

Source:

Amateurs: Elliott (+13),  Kelbrick (+17)

References

External links
Results on European Tour website

Senior major golf championships
Golf tournaments in England
Senior Open Championship
Senior Open Championship
Senior Open Championship